Joe L. Reaves (born May 27, 1950) is a retired professional basketball small forward who played parts of the 1973–74 season in both the National Basketball Association (NBA) and the American Basketball Association (ABA). He attended Bethel College where he was drafted in the third round of the 1973 NBA Draft by the Phoenix Suns. He played seven games for the Suns until he was waived on November 27, 1973. He later signed with the Memphis Tams of the ABA.

External links
 

1950 births
Living people
American men's basketball players
Basketball players from Tennessee
Bethel Wildcats men's basketball players
Memphis Tams players
People from Bolivar, Tennessee
Phoenix Suns draft picks
Phoenix Suns players
Small forwards